Stenoma chalybaeella is a moth of the family Depressariidae. It is found in Amazonas, Brazil.

Adults are cupreous brown with broad wings, the forewings slightly rounded at the tips, tinged with chalybeous and with a transverse ferruginous streak in the disc at two-thirds of the length. There is a ferruginous marginal line, dilated towards the costa and a short black more or less distinct longitudinal streak in the disc before the middle. The exterior border is convex and not oblique. The hindwings are cupreous with a dark cinereous fringe.

References

Moths described in 1864
Stenoma